Legislative elections were held in Argentina for half the seats in the Chamber of Deputies and a third (24) of the seats in the Senate on 28 June 2009, as well as for the legislature of the City of Buenos Aires and other municipalities.

Background
The elections were due to have been held on 25 October 2009. In March 2009, the Mayor of Buenos Aires, Mauricio Macri, moved to bring forward the date of elections to the Buenos Aires City Legislature to June 28, saying that it would increase transparency and democratic quality. Opposition figures criticised the decision, suggesting Macri was attempting to consolidate his power in the city, and building the career of his deputy, Gabriela Michetti, expected to head the list for Macri's coalition in the election. Similar changes to the election date had been introduced in the provinces of Santa Fe and Catamarca (March 2009).

Despite the criticism by politicians from Government ranks that Macri had abused the process by unilaterally changing the election date, President Cristina Fernández de Kirchner announced that she too would be introducing legislation to move the date of national elections forward by four months, to June 28. Despite great debate and the defections of some Peronist legislators, the proposal passed its Congressional stages quickly and the date was successfully changed. The Government claimed it would allow politicians to leave behind campaigning priorities and focus on tackling the ongoing local effect of the international financial crisis. Equally controversial was a decision by Front for Victory leader Néstor Kirchner (the current President's husband and predecessor) to advance stand-in candidates - prominent local lawmakers (notably Buenos Aires Province Governor Daniel Scioli, as well as 15 Greater Buenos Aires-area mayors) who, after the election, would be likely to cede their new seats to down-ticket names.

The elections resulted in a setback for the governing, center-left Front for Victory and its allies, which lost their absolute majorities in both houses of Congress. Former President Néstor Kirchner stood as head of his party list in the important Buenos Aires Province. Kirchner's list was defeated, however, by the center-right Republican Proposal (PRO) list headed by businessman Francisco de Narváez; the loss in Buenos Aires Province, though narrow, is significant as the province has been considered a Peronist stronghold and had helped maintain Kirchnerism as the dominant force in Argentine politics since 2003. Buenos Aires Vice Mayor Gabriela Michetti stood as head of the PRO list for the Lower House, and defeated four other prominent parties; the evening's surprise in Buenos Aires, however, was that of filmmaker Fernando Solanas' left-wing Proyecto Sur, which obtained second place.

The Kirchners' leading opposition on the center-left, the Civic Coalition, also made significant gains – particularly in the Senate, where they gained 7 seats. The Front for Victory had already lost 16 Lower House members and 4 Senators on the heels of the 2008 Argentine government conflict with the agricultural sector over a proposed rise in export tariffs. The crisis was defused by Vice President Julio Cobos' surprise, tie-breaking vote against them on July 16, 2008; but fallout from the controversy led to the President's distancing from Cobos (who successfully supported his own party list in his native Mendoza Province), a sharp drop in presidential approval ratings, and the aforementioned congressional defections. One especially successful ex-Kirchnerist was Santa Fe Province Senator Carlos Reutemann, who after the agrarian conflict formed Santa Fe Federal. His new party narrowly bested local Socialist Party leader Rubén Giustiniani, who would garner one of Santa Fe's three Senate seats. The Front for Victory retained a plurality in both houses, however (they will, with two allies, be one seat short of an absolute majority in the Senate).

Results

Chamber of Deputies

Results by province

Senate

Results by province

References

External links

2009 elections in Argentina
Elections in Argentina
Presidency of Cristina Fernández de Kirchner